"Kafundanga" Chingunji (died January 1974)  served as the first Chief of Staff in the government of UNITA, pro-Western rebels, during the Angolan Civil War (1975–2002). As the patriarch of the Chingunji family he founded a political dynasty based in Angola's Central Highlands.

Death
Officially, Chingunji died from cerebral malaria on Angola's border with Zambia. His wife and others who saw his body say someone poisoned Chingunji. Rumors later alleged Jonas Savimbi, the head of UNITA, ordered his assassination.

See also
List of unsolved deaths

References

1974 deaths
Angolan politicians
Angolan rebels
Angolan warlords
People of the Angolan Civil War
UNITA politicians
Unsolved deaths
Year of birth missing
Angolan revolutionaries